, 3,945 places are heritage-listed in the City of Fremantle, of which 270 are on the State Register of Heritage Places. The State Register of Heritage Places is maintained by the Heritage Council of Western Australia.

List
The Western Australian State Register of Heritage Places, lists the following 270 state registered places within the City of Fremantle:

Former places
The following place has been removed from the State Register of Heritage Places within the City of Fremantle:

Notes

 A search for Fremantle LGA returns 5,092 hits, of which 1,146 are for the East Fremantle LGA and 3,945 for Fremantle LGA and one for Perth LGA
 A search for Fremantle LGA returns 285 hits, of which 15 are for the East Fremantle LGA and 270 for Fremantle LGA
 No coordinates specified by Inherit database or, in case of West End, Fremantle, covering a large area

References

Fremantle